George Jarrett Helm Jr. (March 23, 1950 – disappeared March 7, 1977) was a Native Hawaiian activist and musician from Kalamaula, Molokai, Hawaii. He graduated from St. Louis High School on Oahu, about which he said, "I came to Honolulu to get educated. Instead I lost my innocence." While at St. Louis, he studied under Hawaiian cultural expert John Keola Lake, and Kahauanu Lake. George achieved mastery in vocal performance and guitar.

Overview
Helm was one of the greatest Hawaiian falsetto vocalists, and played fast, complex guitar parts while singing in an "almost inhuman" vocal range. He was a powerful speaker, writer, and "revolutionary" philosopher who pioneered many Hawaiian sovereignty concepts. He was considered, as his posthumous album title suggests, a "True Hawaiian" who surfed, fished, farmed, loved, sang, worshipped, and thought in the ways of old.

Activism

Helm began his front-line activism in the Molokai-based group Hui Alaloa around 1975, and became deeply involved in Protect Kahoolawe Ohana, a Hawaiian-led organization that sought to end the bombing of the island of Kahoolawe, a Hawaiian island used as target practice by the U.S. Navy. In 1976, nine activists occupied the island of Kahoolawe, Helm among them. He was moved intensely by the power and beauty of the island, and dedicated the rest of his life to fighting for its protection.

Helm, stating "We were touched by some force that pushed us into commitment." (Hawaii Observer, 1976), appealed to the Hawaii State legislature and to the U.S. Congress, where he proved to be a persuasive writer and orator, for Kahoolawe's protection. However, the bombing continued. More Kahoolawe landings by protesters ensued, and on January 30, 1977, five activists (Helm, Walter Ritte, Richard Sawyer, Charles Warrington, and Francis Kauhane) landed on Kahoolawe in an attempt to gain greater public recognition of the struggle. Everyone was arrested except for Ritte and Sawyer, who stayed hidden on the island for 35 days, with very limited food and water.

Disappearance
Concerned for Walter Ritte and Richard Sawyer (bombing protesters who were in hiding on the deserted island of Kahoolawe), and beset by vivid dreams and visions, George Helm set out — first by boat, then by surfboard — to Kahoolawe, with Maui fisherman and park ranger Kimo Mitchell and water expert Billy Mitchell (unrelated). They reached the island, but Sawyer and Ritte had already been picked up. The next day, the boat belonging to Maxwell Han from Hana that was scheduled to meet Helm, Kimo Mitchell, and Billy Mitchell and return them to Maui was discovered swamped. Apparently, someone had removed the plug out of the small Boston Whaler. Not refitting the plug prior to launch is a common mistake among novice boaters. The three apparently decided to return to Maui and they had a long board, a short board and a pair of fins between them. The weather was extremely treacherous with high winds, small craft warnings, and pounding waves on the shoreline. On the entry to the water George Helm was injured with a gash to his head. Once they were in the water it was obvious to all of them that the currents and ocean conditions were going to prevent them from reaching Maui. They realized they were in a life-threatening situation. At this point Billy Mitchell took the long board and headed back to Kaho'olawe to get help. It took him a good part of the day to reach the shore and walk across the island to notify the Navy of the situation and to get the Coast Guard involved in a rescue operation. Helm and Kimo Mitchell were last seen near the tiny crescent-shaped islet of Molokini by Billy Mitchell, who was the only survivor of the group.

Legacy
Today, George Helm Jr. is hailed as one of the Aloha ʻĀina movement's greatest heroes; among young activists he is as legendary as the great Eddie Aikau is to young surfers. Although his only musical recordings were made with minimal technology in a local bar, they are played regularly on all Hawaiian music stations. Generations later, George Helm's music is still inspirational to many, both because it is considered to be some of the finest examples of Hawaiian falsetto ever created, and because it embodies one of the most powerful expressions of the Hawaiian soul. The popular song, "Hawaiian Soul," by Jon Osorio and Randy Borden, was written in his memory.

In 2020, filmmaker ‘Āina Paikai released a 19-minute film, Hawaiian Soul, about Helm's life.

Quotes
"We are in a revolution of consciousness .... What we (are) looking for is the truth."

"There is man and there is environment. One does not supersede the other. The breath in man is the breath of Papa. Man is merely the caretaker of the land that maintains his life and nourishes his soul. Therefore, the āina is sacred. The church of life is not in a building, it is the open sky, the surrounding ocean, the beautiful soil...."

See also
List of people who disappeared mysteriously at sea

References

External links

  

1950 births
1970s missing person cases
1977 deaths
20th-century American singers
20th-century American male singers
American anti-war activists
American community activists
American environmentalists
American anti-racism activists
Missing people
Missing person cases in Hawaii
Native Hawaiian activists
Native Hawaiian people
Nonviolence advocates
People lost at sea
Singers from Hawaii